Irving Marble Porter (May 17, 1888 – February 20, 1971) was an outfielder in Major League Baseball. He played for the Chicago White Sox.

References

External links

1888 births
1971 deaths
Major League Baseball outfielders
Chicago White Sox players
Baseball players from Massachusetts
Sportspeople from Lynn, Massachusetts
Lynn Shoemakers players
Lynn Fighters players
Lynn Pirates players
Lynn Pipers players
Lawrence Barristers players
Waterbury Nattatucks players